Brzozówka may refer to the following places:
Brzozówka, Kuyavian-Pomeranian Voivodeship (north-central Poland)
Brzozówka, Lublin Voivodeship (east Poland)
Brzozówka, Podlaskie Voivodeship (north-east Poland)
Brzozówka, Poddębice County in Łódź Voivodeship (central Poland)
Brzozówka, Rawa County in Łódź Voivodeship (central Poland)
Brzozówka, Kraków County in Lesser Poland Voivodeship (south Poland)
Brzozówka, Olkusz County in Lesser Poland Voivodeship (south Poland)
Brzozówka, Tarnów County in Lesser Poland Voivodeship (south Poland)
Brzozówka, Świętokrzyskie Voivodeship (south-central Poland)
Brzozówka, Kozienice County in Masovian Voivodeship (east-central Poland)
Brzozówka, Mińsk County in Masovian Voivodeship (east-central Poland)
Brzozówka, Ostrołęka County in Masovian Voivodeship (east-central Poland)
Brzozówka, Nowy Dwór Mazowiecki County in Masovian Voivodeship (east-central Poland)
Brzozówka, Greater Poland Voivodeship (west-central Poland)
Brzozówka, Lubusz Voivodeship (west Poland)
Brzozówka, Pomeranian Voivodeship (north Poland)

Byarozawka (Grodno Region, Belarus)